Baldwin County is a  county located in the southwestern part of the U.S. state of Alabama, on the Gulf coast. It is one of only two counties in Alabama that border the Gulf of Mexico, along with Mobile County. As of the 2020 census, the population was 231,767. The county seat is Bay Minette. The county is named after senator Abraham Baldwin, though he never lived in what is now Alabama. 

Baldwin was Alabama's fastest-growing county from 2010 to 2020, with 4 of the top 10 fastest-growing cities in the state in recent years.   

The U.S. federal government designates Baldwin County as the Daphne-Fairhope-Foley, AL Metropolitan Statistical Area.

It is the largest county in Alabama by area and is located on the eastern side of Mobile Bay. Part of its western border with Mobile County is formed by the Spanish River, a brackish distributary river.

History
Baldwin County was established on December 21, 1809, ten years before Alabama became a state. Previously, the county had been a part of the Mississippi Territory until 1817, when the area was included in the separate Alabama Territory. Statehood was gained by Alabama in 1819.

There have been numerous border changes to the county as population grew and other counties were formed. Numerous armies have invaded during the Revolutionary War, War of 1812, and Civil War.

In the first days of Baldwin County, the town of McIntosh Bluff on the Tombigbee River was the county seat. (It is now included in Mobile County, west of Baldwin County.) The county seat was transferred to the town of Blakeley in 1820, and then to the city of Daphne in 1868. In 1900, by an act of the legislature of Alabama, the county seat was authorized for relocation to the city of Bay Minette; however, the city of Daphne resisted this relocation.

To achieve the relocation, the men of Bay Minette devised a scheme. They fabricated a murder to lure the Sheriff and his deputy out of the city of Daphne. While the law was chasing down the fictitious killer during the late hours, the group of Bay Minette men stealthily traveled the seventeen miles (27 km) to Daphne, stole the Baldwin County Courthouse records, and delivered them to the city of Bay Minette, where Baldwin County's county seat remains. A New Deal mural, completed by WPA artists during the Great Depression, depicts these events. It hangs in the Bay Minette United States Post Office.

During the American Civil War, 32 men hailing from Baldwin County enlisted with a Union unit mustered in Pensacola, Florida called the 1st Florida Cavalry Regiment. In 1860, Baldwin County was the least populous of Alabama's 52 counties. Half of the population were enslaved. There was also a large population of Muscogee (Creek) in the northern portion of the county.

Due to its proximity to the Gulf of Mexico, Baldwin County frequently endures tropical weather systems, including hurricanes. Since the late 20th century, the county has been declared a disaster area multiple times. This was due to heavy damages in September 1979 from Hurricane Frederic, July 1997 from Hurricane Danny, September 1998 from Hurricane Georges, September 2004 from Hurricane Ivan, and August 2005 from Hurricane Katrina.

2016 flag controversy
Baldwin County attracted national attention after the 2016 Orlando nightclub shooting as the only county in the United States to refuse to lower its flags to half-staff. Both President Obama and Alabama Governor Robert Bentley had ordered all flags to be lowered immediately following the attack, which was believed to have specifically targeted the LGBTQ community. Citing the U.S. Flag Code, Baldwin County Commissioner Tucker Dorsey stated that while his "heart certainly goes out to the victims and their families," the incident "doesn't meet the test of the reason for the flag to be lowered."

Geography

It is the largest county by area in Alabama and the 12th-largest county east of the Mississippi River. It is larger than the US state of Rhode Island.

Adjacent counties
Monroe County - northeast
Escambia County, Florida - east
Escambia County, Alabama - east
Mobile County - west
Washington County - northwest
Clarke County - northwest

Environmental recognition
Two separate areas in Baldwin County have been designated as "Outstanding Alabama Water" by the Alabama Environmental Management Commission, which oversees the Alabama Department of Environmental Management. As of April 2007, only two other areas in Alabama have received what is the "highest environmental status" in the state. Officials believe the "pristine water" will become an important eco-tourism destination.

National protected area
 Bon Secour National Wildlife Refuge (part)

Transportation

Major highways
 Interstate 10
  Interstate 65
 U.S. Highway 31
 U.S. Highway 90
 U.S. Highway 98
 State Route 59
 State Route 104
 State Route 180
 State Route 181
 State Route 182
 State Route 225
 State Route 287
 Baldwin Beach Express

Airports
Bay Minette, 1R8, has a single runway 08/26 that is 5,497'
Fairhope, KCQF, has a single runway 01/19 that is 6,604'
Foley, 5R4, has a single runway 18/36 that is 3,700'
Stockton, Hubbard Landing Seaplane Base HL2 has one water runway that is 6,000’
Gulf Shores, Jack Edwards Airport JKA has two runways, 09/27 at 6,962' and 17/35 at 3,596'

There are numerous private airports and heliports in Baldwin County. Considerable military airspace overlies much of the county and adjacent bay and coastal waters.

Commercial, scheduled service is from Mobile Regional Airport, Mobile Downtown Airport, or Pensacola International Airport.

Demographics

2020

As of the 2020 United States census, there were 231,767 people, 82,325 households, and 53,962 families residing in the county.

2010
Whereas according to the 2010 United States census Bureau:

85.7% White
9.4% Black
0.7% Native American
0.7% Asian
0.4% Native Hawaiian or Pacific Islander
1.5% Two or more races
4.4% Hispanic or Latino (of any race)

As of the census of 2010, there were 182,265 people, 73,180 households, and 51,151 families residing in the county. The population density was 110 people per square mile (40/km2). There were 104,061 housing units at an average density of 54 per square mile (23/km2). The racial makeup of the county was 85.7% White, 9.4% Black or African American, 0.7% Native American, 0.7% Asian, 0.04% Pacific Islander, 2.0% from other races, and 1.5% from two or more races. 4.4% of the population were Hispanic or Latino of any race.

There were 73,180 households, out of which 28.0% had children under the age of 18 living with them, 54.5% were married couples living together, 11.1% had a female householder with no husband present, and 30.1% were non-families. 25.1% of all households were made up of individuals, and 10.2% had someone living alone who was 65 years of age or older. The average household size was 2.46 and the average family size was 2.93.

In the county, the population was spread out, with 23% under the age of 18, 10.6% from 18 to 24, 24.4% from 25 to 44, 28.3% from 45 to 64, and 16.9% who were 65 years of age or older. The median age was 41.1 years. For every 100 females, there were 95.7 males. For every 100 females age 18 and over, there were 95.46 males.

The median income for a household in the county was $40,250, and the median income for a family was $47,028. Males had a median income of $34,507 versus $23,069 for females. The per capita income for the county was $20,826. 10.10% of the population and 7.60% of families were below the poverty line. 13.10% of those under the age of 18 and 8.90% of those 65 and older were living below the poverty line.

According to the 2000 census, 21.4% were of American, 12.5% English, 11.4% German and 9.9% Irish ancestry.

In 2000, the largest denominational groups were Evangelical Protestants (with 38,670 adherents) and Mainline Protestants (with 16,399 adherents). The largest religious bodies were the Southern Baptist Convention (with 27,789 members) and the Catholic Church (with 10,482 members).

Education 
Baldwin County contains two public school districts. There are approximately 32,500 students in public K-12 schools in Baldwin County. Prior to the 2019-2020 school year, there was only one school district, overseen by the Baldwin County Board of Education. The city of Gulf Shores has since set up its own school system, following a city council vote in 2017. In the spring of 2022, the city council of Orange Beach also voted to breakaway from the county school system.

There are Catholic elementary schools in the county, including Christ the King (Daphne), St. Patrick (Robertsdale) and St. Benedict (Elberta). Beginning in 2016, there is also a Catholic high school, St. Michael Catholic High School, located just east of Fairhope.

Coastal Alabama Community College has several campuses in the county. The United States Sports Academy is a private university focused on sports and located in Daphne.

Districts 
School districts include:

 Baldwin County School District
 Gulf Shores City School District

Government
Baldwin County was one of the earliest counties in Alabama in which the old-line Southern Democrats began splitting their tickets, even going so far as to vote for Dwight D. Eisenhower's 1956 re-election bid. Today, it is one of the most solidly Republican counties in Alabama. No Republican has failed to win a majority in the county since 1968, when it was easily carried by George Wallace running on a segregationist third-party ticket. The county has not voted for a Democratic presidential candidate since 1960.

The county is governed by a four-member county commission, elected from single-member districts. A sheriff, coroner, and revenue commissioner are elected in at-large positions countywide.
The sheriff of Baldwin County is Hoss Mack (R).

The commissioners are as follows:

District 1: James E. Ball (R)

District 2: Joseph Davis III (R)

District 3: Billie Jo Underwood (R)

District 4: Charles F. Gruber (R)

The coroner is Brian Pierce (R) and the district attorney is Robert Wilters (R).

Law enforcement

The Baldwin County Sheriff's Office is the primary law enforcement agency for unincorporated areas of Baldwin County. The current sheriff is Huey H. Mack, who joined the Sheriff's Office in 1989 as a Criminal Investigator. The first sheriff, Benjamin Baldwin, was appointed on 21 December, 1809.

Regions
North Baldwin
Eastern Shore
Central Baldwin
South Baldwin
Southwest Baldwin
East Baldwin

Communities

Cities

Bay Minette (county seat)
Daphne
Fairhope
Foley
Gulf Shores
 Loxley
Orange Beach
Robertsdale (includes Rosinton)
Spanish Fort

Towns

 Elberta
 Magnolia Springs
 Perdido Beach
 Silverhill
 Summerdale

Census-designated place

 Bon Secour
 Lillian
 Perdido
 Point Clear
 Stapleton
 Stockton

Unincorporated areas

 Barnwell
 Battles Wharf
 Belforest
 Blacksher
 Bromley
 Carpenter's Station
 Clay City
 Crossroads
 Elsanor
 Fort Morgan
 Gasque
 Gateswood
 Hurricane
 Josephine
 Latham
 Little River
 Malbis
 Marlow
 Miflin
 Montrose
 Oak
 Ono Island
 Oyster Bay
 Pine Grove
 Rabun
 Seacliff
 Seminole
 Swift
 Tensaw
 Yelling Settlement

Ghost town
Blakeley

Secession proposal

Perdido County, Alabama would contain northern Baldwin County, divided by a straight line extending westward from the northwestern tip of Florida, and western Escambia County, west of Big Escambia Creek.  (The Flomaton area is excluded via a prominent power line easement, from Big Escambia Creek to the Florida state line.)  The southwestern tip of Conecuh County, also west of Big Escambia Creek, may be included as well.  The headwaters of the Perdido River rise near the center of this proposed county.  The Perdido County seat would be Atmore.  The county has been proposed by city of Atmore backers, who believe that their growing city of over 11,000 residents should be a county seat.  Furthermore, county backers believe that Atmore belongs in the Mobile-Daphne-Fairhope metropolitan combined statistical area, which would become much more likely within its own exurban-leaning county.  Brewton would remain the county seat of rural-leaning Escambia County.  In addition to the incorporated city of Atmore, Perdido County would include the unincorporated communities of Blacksher, Canoe, Freemanville, Huxford, Nokomis, Perdido and Tensaw.

See also
National Register of Historic Places listings in Baldwin County, Alabama
Properties on the Alabama Register of Landmarks and Heritage in Baldwin County, Alabama

References

External links

 
 Baldwin County map of roads/towns (map © 2007 Univ. of Alabama).
 Baldwin County Economic Development Alliance
 Baldwin County Alabama Genealogy
 Baldwin County Alabama Free Census Records
 Baldwin County Alabama Archives and Libraries
 Baldwin County Alabama Cemeteries
 Gulf Shores & Orange Beach Tourism Board

 
1809 establishments in Mississippi Territory
Micropolitan areas of Alabama
Populated places established in 1809